Michael E. DeBakey High School for Health Professions at Qatar (DHSHP@Q in short) is a private international middle and secondary school in Doha, Qatar.

Named after Michael E. DeBakey, the school opened in September 2008 with grades 8 through 10 with 100 students per grade; the school will ultimately cover all of highschool. The school's structure has the 8th Grade Academy to prepare students for the high school levels. The curriculum is based on United States school coursework with Advanced Placement classes. The school's classes will be taught in the English language. Students will pay tuition; vouchers will accommodate low income students. The Houston Chronicle stated that the school will likely draw Qataris and American expatriates.

The school is located in Messeila and is close to the Hamad Medical Center.

See also

 Americans in Qatar
 DeBakey High School for Health Professions

References

External links
 DeBakey High School for Health Professions at Qatar
 DeBakey High School for Health Professions at Qatar (Archive)
 Two International Schools to Open Branches in Qatar
 Foster, Robin. "Principal brings Qatar experience to her role." Houston Chronicle. Wednesday August 24, 2011.
 "Preparing students for careers in medicine." Gulf Times. Tuesday May 6, 2008.

Schools in Qatar
American international schools in Qatar
2008 establishments in Qatar
Educational institutions established in 2008